Upper Town Creek Rural Historic District is a national historic district located near Wilson, in Edgecombe and Wilson County, North Carolina. The district encompasses 117 contributing buildings and 2 contributing structures on four contiguous farms near Wilson.  The main plantation house on each farm are the Federal-style W. D. Petway House (c. 1820); the Greek Revival house built for Colonel David Williams (c. 1845-1860); the house built for Cally S. Braswell  ("Hawthorne"; c. 1855); and the board and batten Gothic Revival Jesse Norris House (c. 1845-1860).  The remaining contributing building and structures include packhouses, tobacco barns, tenant houses, and other agricultural outbuildings.

It was listed on the National Register of Historic Places in 1986.

References

Historic districts on the National Register of Historic Places in North Carolina
Federal architecture in North Carolina
Greek Revival architecture in North Carolina
Gothic Revival architecture in North Carolina
Buildings and structures in Edgecombe County, North Carolina
National Register of Historic Places in Edgecombe County, North Carolina
Buildings and structures in Wilson County, North Carolina
National Register of Historic Places in Wilson County, North Carolina